The 2021 UCI World Tour was a series of races that included twenty-nine road cycling events throughout the 2021 cycling season. The tour started with the opening stage of the UAE Tour on 21 February, and concluded with Il Lombardia on 9 October.

Events
The 2021 calendar was announced in the autumn of 2020.

Cancelled events
Due to COVID-19-related logistical concerns raised by teams regarding travel to Australia (including strict quarantine requirements), the Tour Down Under (19–24 January) and the Cadel Evans Great Ocean Road Race (31 January) were cancelled. The organisers of the Tour Down Under held a "domestic cycling festival" known as the Santos Festival of Cycling in its place, which featured races in various disciplines (including a National Road Series event). In June, the Grand Prix Cycliste de Québec (10 September) and the Grand Prix Cycliste de Montréal (12 September) were cancelled due to the COVID-19 pandemic in Canada. In August, the Hamburg Cyclassics (15 August) and the Tour of Guangxi (14–19 October) were cancelled at the request of their respective organisers, due to the COVID-19 pandemic.

In addition, and for reasons not entirely related to the pandemic, the organisers of the Tour of California in the United States as well as those of the Prudential RideLondon–Surrey Classic in the United Kingdom did not request to register either of their respective events for the 2021 calendar.

Notes

References

External links

 
2021
2021 in men's road cycling